Giorgio Vasari (also , ; 30 July 1511 – 27 June 1574) was an Italian Renaissance Master, who worked as a  painter, architect, engineer, writer, and historian,  who is best known for his work The Lives of the Most Excellent Painters, Sculptors, and Architects, considered the ideological foundation of all art-historical writing, and the basis for biographies of several Renaissance artists, including Leonardo da Vinci and Michelangelo. Vasari designed the Tomb of Michelangelo in the Basilica of Santa Croce, Florence that was completed in 1578. Based on Vasari's text in print about Giotto's new manner of painting as a rinascita (rebirth), author Jules Michelet in his Histoire de France (1835) suggested adoption of Vasari's concept, using the term Renaissance (rebirth, in French) to distinguish the cultural change. The term was adopted thereafter in historiography and still is in use today.

Life
Vasari was born prematurely on 30 July 1511 in Arezzo, Tuscany. Recommended at an early age by his cousin Luca Signorelli, he became a pupil of Guglielmo da Marsiglia, a skillful painter of stained glass. Sent to Florence at the age of sixteen by Cardinal Silvio Passerini, he joined the circle of Andrea del Sarto and his pupils, Rosso Fiorentino and Jacopo Pontormo, where his humanist education was encouraged. He was befriended by Michelangelo, whose painting style would influence his own. He died on 27 June 1574 in Florence, Grand Duchy of Tuscany, aged 62.

Painting
In 1529, he visited Rome where he studied the works of Raphael and other artists of the Roman High Renaissance. Vasari's own Mannerist paintings were more admired in his lifetime than afterward. In 1547, he completed the hall of the chancery in Palazzo della Cancelleria in Rome with frescoes that received the name Sala dei Cento Giorni. He was employed consistently by members of the Medici family in Florence and Rome, and worked in Naples (for example on the Vasari Sacristy), Arezzo, and other places. Many of his paintings still exist, the most important being on the wall and ceiling of the Sala di Cosimo I in the Palazzo Vecchio in Florence, where he and his assistants were at work from 1555. Vasari also helped to organize the decoration of the Studiolo, now reassembled in the Palazzo Vecchio.In Rome, he painted frescos in the Sala Regia. Included among his better-known pupils or followers are Sebastiano Flori, Bartolomeo Carducci, Mirabello Cavalori (Salincorno), Stefano Veltroni (of Monte San Savino), and Alessandro Fortori (of Arezzo).

His last major commission was vast The Last Judgement fresco on the ceiling of the cupola of the Florence Cathedral that he began in 1572 with the assistance of the Bolognese painter Lorenzo Sabatini. Unfinished at the time of Vasari's death it was completed by Federico Zuccari.

Architecture

Aside from his career as a painter, Vasari was successful as an architect. His loggia of the Palazzo degli Uffizi by the Arno opens up the vista at the far end of its long narrow courtyard. It is a unique piece of urban planning that functions as a public piazza, and which, if considered as a short street, is unique as a Renaissance street with a unified architectural treatment. The view of the Loggia from the Arno reveals that, with the Vasari Corridor, it is one of very few structures lining the river that are open to the river and appear to embrace the riverside environment.

In Florence, Vasari also built the long passage, now called Vasari Corridor, which connects the Uffizi with the Palazzo Pitti on the other side of the river. The enclosed corridor passes alongside the River Arno on an arcade, crosses the Ponte Vecchio, and winds around the exterior of several buildings. It was once the home of the Mercado de Vecchio.

He renovated the medieval churches of Santa Maria Novella and Santa Croce. At both, he removed the original rood screen and loft, and remodelled the retro-choirs in the Mannerist taste of his time. 

In Santa Croce, he was responsible for the painting of The Adoration of the Magi that was commissioned by Pope Pius V in 1566 and completed in February 1567. It was restored recently, before being put on exhibition in 2011 in Rome and in Naples. Eventually, it will be returned to the church of Santa Croce in Bosco Marengo (Province of Alessandria, Piedmont).

In 1562, Vasari built the octagonal dome on the Basilica of Our Lady of Humility in Pistoia, an important example of High Renaissance architecture.

In Rome, Vasari worked with Giacomo Barozzi da Vignola and Bartolomeo Ammannati at Pope Julius III's Villa Giulia.

The Lives of the Most Excellent Painters, Sculptors, and Architects

Often called "the first art historian", Vasari invented the genre of the encyclopedia of artistic biographies with his Le Vite de' più eccellenti pittori, scultori, ed architettori (Lives of the Most Excellent Painters, Sculptors, and Architects), first published in 1550 and dedicated to Grand Duke Cosimo I de' Medici. He was the first to use the term "Rinascita" (rebirth in Italian) in print – although an awareness of an ongoing "rebirth" in the arts had been in the air since the time of Alberti. Vasari's term, applied to the change in artistic styles with the work of Giotto, eventually would become the French term Renaissance (rebirth) for the era that followed. Vasari was responsible for the modern use of the term Gothic art, as well, although he only used the word Goth in association with the German style that preceded the rebirth, which he identified as "barbaric". 

The Lives also included a novel treatise on the technical methods employed in the arts. The book was partly rewritten and enlarged in 1568, with the addition of woodcut portraits of artists (some conjectural).The work has a consistent and notorious bias in favour of Florentines and tends to attribute to them all the developments in Renaissance art – for example, the invention of engraving. Venetian art in particular (along with arts from other parts of Europe), is ignored systematically in the first edition. Between his first and second editions, Vasari visited Venice and while the second edition gave more attention to Venetian art (finally including Titian), it did so without achieving a neutral point of view. 

Many inaccuracies exist within his Lives. For example, Vasari writes that Andrea del Castagno killed Domenico Veneziano, which is incorrect; Andrea died several years before Domenico. In another example, Vasari's biography of Giovanni Antonio Bazzi, whom he calls "Il Soddoma", published only in the second edition of the Lives (1568) after Bazzi's death, condemns the artist as being immoral, bestial, and vain. Vasari dismisses Bazzi's work as lazy and offensive, despite the artist's having been named a Cavaliere di Cristo by Pope Leo X and having received important commissions for the Villa Farnese and other sites.

Vasari's biographies are interspersed with amusing gossip. Many of his anecdotes have the ring of truth, while others are inventions or generic fictions, such as the tale of young Giotto painting a fly on the surface of a painting by Cimabue that supposedly, the older master repeatedly tried to brush away, a genre tale that echoes anecdotes told of the Greek painter Apelles. He did not research archives for exact dates, as modern art historians do, and naturally, his biographies are most dependable for the painters of his own generation and those of the immediate past generation. Modern criticism – with new materials opened up by research – has corrected many of his traditional dates and attributions.  

Vasari includes a sketch of his own biography at the end of the Lives, and adds further details about him and his family in his lives of Lazzaro Vasari and Francesco Salviati.

According to the historian Richard Goldthwaite, Vasari was one of the earliest authors to use the term "competition" (or "concorrenza" in Italian) in its economic sense. He used it repeatedly, and stressed the concept in his introduction to the life of Pietro Perugino, in explaining the reasons for Florentine artistic preeminence. In Vasari's view, Florentine artists excelled because they were hungry, and they were hungry because their fierce competition amongst themselves for commissions kept them so. Competition, he said, is "one of the nourishments that maintain them".

Social standing
Vasari enjoyed high repute during his lifetime and amassed a considerable fortune. He married Niccolosa Bacci, a member of one of the richest and most prominent families of Arezzo. He was made Knight of the Golden Spur by the Pope. He was elected to the municipal council of his native town and finally, rose to the supreme office of gonfaloniere. 

He built a fine house in Arezzo in 1547 and decorated its walls and vaults with paintings. It is now a museum in his honour named the Casa Vasari, whilst his residence in Florence is also preserved. 

In 1563, he helped found the Florentine Accademia e Compagnia delle Arti del Disegno, with the Grand Duke and Michelangelo as capi of the institution. Thirty-six artists were chosen as members.

Gallery

References and sources
References

Sources
The Lives of the Artists Oxford University Press, 1998. 
Lives of the Painters, Sculptors and Architects, Volumes I and II. Everyman's Library, 1996. 
Vasari on Technique. Dover Publications, 1980. 
Life of Michelangelo. Alba House, 2003.

Further reading

External links

 
 
 
 
 Biography of Vasari and analysis for four major works
 
Giorgio Vasari – The First Art-Historian
Copies of Vasari's Lives of the Artists online:
“Giorgio Vasari's Lives of the Artists.” Site created by Adrienne DeAngelis. Now largely completed in the posting of the Lives, intended to be re-translated to become the unabridged English version.
Le Vite, 1550 Unabridged, original Italian.
Stories Of The Italian Artists From Vasari, translated by E L Seeley, 1908. Abridged, in English.
 Le Vite – Edizioni Giuntina e Torrentiniana
 Gli artisti principali citati dal Vasari nelle Vite (elenco)
Excerpts from the Vite combined with photos of works mentioned by Vasari.

Giorgio Vasari
Italian Mannerist painters
Italian Mannerist architects
1511 births
1574 deaths
Artist authors
Italian biographers
Italian art historians
Italian art critics
Italian male non-fiction writers
Male biographers
Painters from Tuscany
People from Arezzo
Art technological sources
Uffizi
16th-century Italian architects
16th-century Italian painters
Italian male painters
16th-century Italian writers
16th-century male writers
Biographers of artists
Architects of Roman Catholic churches
Catholic painters
16th-century biographers